Omertà (Italian pronunciation: [ɔmɛrˈta]) is the debut full-length album by American heavy metal band Adrenaline Mob. The album was released on March 13, 2012, in North America by  Elm City Music, and on March 19 in Europe through Century Media Records. Omertà was produced by Adrenaline Mob and mixed by Jay Ruston, and being the only album to featured drummer Mike Portnoy.

Track listing 
All songs written by Mike Orlando and Russell Allen unless otherwise noted.

Charts

Personnel 
 Russell Allen – vocals
 Mike Orlando – guitars, bass, talk-box on "Psychosane"
 Mike Portnoy – drums

References 

2012 debut albums
Century Media Records albums
Adrenaline Mob albums